The 2015 Judo Grand Slam was held in Abu Dhabi, United Arab Emirates, from 30 October–1 November 2015.

Medal summary

Men's events

Women's events

Source Results

Medal table

References

External links
 

2015 IJF World Tour
2015 Judo Grand Slam
Judo
Grand Slam Abu Dhabi 2015
Judo
Judo